Casualties of War is a 1989 American war drama film directed by Brian De Palma and written by David Rabe, based primarily on an article written by Daniel Lang for The New Yorker in 1969, which was later published as a book. The film stars Michael J. Fox and Sean Penn, and is based on the events of the 1966 incident on Hill 192 during the Vietnam War, in which a Vietnamese woman was kidnapped from her village by a squad of American soldiers, who raped and murdered her. For the film, all names and some details of the true story were altered.

Plot
The story is presented as a flashback of Max Eriksson, a Vietnam veteran.

Lieutenant Reilly leads his platoon of American soldiers on a nighttime patrol. They are attacked by the Viet Cong (VC) after a panicked soldier exposes their position. While guarding the platoon's flank, Eriksson falls as the top of a VC tunnel gives way beneath him. Eriksson's squad leader, Sergeant Tony Meserve, pulls Eriksson out of the hole and eventually, the platoon retreats out of the jungle.

The platoon takes a break outside a river village in the Central Highlands. While relaxing and joking around, one of Meserve's friends, Specialist 4 "Brownie" Brown, is killed when the Viet Cong ambushes them. Brownie's death has a major impact on Meserve. The platoon is sent back to their base. Private First Class Antonio Dìaz arrives as the replacement radio operator.

Frustrated because his squad has been denied leave for an extended period, Meserve orders the squad to kidnap a Vietnamese girl. Eriksson strenuously objects, but Meserve, Corporal Thomas E. Clark and Private First Class Herbert Hatcher ignore him. Before the quintet disembarks, Eriksson voices his concerns to his closest friend, Rowan. At nightfall, the squad enters a village and kidnaps a Vietnamese girl, Tran Thi Oanh.

As the squad treks through the mountains, Dìaz begins to reconsider raping Tran and begs Eriksson to back him up. The squad and Tran eventually take refuge in an abandoned hooch, where Eriksson is confronted and threatened by Meserve, Clark, and Hatcher. Dìaz suddenly gives in to the pressure, leaving Eriksson alone in opposing the act. Meserve forces Eriksson to stand guard outside while the other men sequentially rape Tran.

At daybreak, Eriksson is ordered to guard Tran while the rest of the squad takes up a position near a railroad bridge overlooking a Viet Cong river supply depot. Through his acts of kindness, Eriksson manages to earn Tran's trust and prepares to go AWOL and return Tran to her family. However, Meserve sends Clark to get Eriksson and Tran to go to the bridge before Eriksson can carry out his plan.

Meserve has Dìaz order close air support for an assault on the depot and then orders Dìaz to kill Tran with a knife. Before Dìaz can kill her, Eriksson fires his rifle into the air, exposing them to the nearby Viet Cong. Amidst the firefight, Tran tries to escape, despite being repeatedly stabbed by Clark. Eriksson tries to save her, but Meserve stops him and knocks him down with the butt of his gun. Eriksson watches helplessly as the entire squad shoots Tran numerous times until she falls off the bridge to her death.

After the battle, Eriksson wakes up in a field hospital at the base. He eventually bumps into Rowan and tells him everything that happened. Rowan suggests that Eriksson see Reilly and company commander Captain Hill. Reilly and Hill both prefer to bury the matter but Hill, infuriated at Eriksson's determination to press the issue, resolves to get rid of Eriksson and orders him transferred to a tunnel rat unit. The other men in Meserve's squad will all be reassigned as well.

After narrowly escaping an attempt to kill him in the latrine with a grenade (made by Clark), Eriksson storms into a tent and smacks Clark in the face with a shovel, reminding Meserve that killing him is unnecessary because no one cares about what they did. Meserve shakily derides Eriksson, saying he's crazy, and Eriksson leaves.

Eriksson then meets an Army chaplain at a bar and describes what happened during the patrol. The chaplain in turn reports it, launching an investigation. The four men who participated in the rape and murder are court martialed: Meserve receives 10 years hard labor and a dishonorable discharge, Clark receives life in prison, and Hatcher and Diaz receive 15 and 8 years of hard labor, respectively.

At the end of the film, Eriksson wakens from a nightmare to find himself on a J-Church transit line in San Francisco, just a few seats from a Vietnamese-American student who resembles Tran. She disembarks at Dolores Park and forgets her scarf, prompting Eriksson to run after her to return it. As she thanks him and turns away, he calls after her in Vietnamese. She surmises that she reminds him of someone, and that he has had a bad dream. They go their separate ways, and Eriksson is somewhat comforted.

Cast
The film continued the pseudonyms Lang used in his article, even though the soldiers' real names had since become public. Only the victim Tran Thi Oanh was referred to by her real name.

 Michael J. Fox as Private First Class Max Eriksson (based on Robert M. Storeby)
 Sean Penn as Sergeant Tony Meserve (based on David Edward Gervase)
 Don Patrick Harvey as Corporal Thomas E. Clark
 John C. Reilly as Private First Class Herbert Hatcher 
 John Leguizamo as Private First Class Antonio Dìaz 
 Thuy Thu Le as Tran Thi Oanh / Asian Student On The Train
 Erik King as Specialist 4 "Brownie" Brown
 Jack Gwaltney as Rowan
 Ving Rhames as Lieutenant Reilly
 Dale Dye as Captain Hill
 Holt McCallany as Lieutenant Kramer
 Dan Martin as Sergeant Hawthorne
 Wendell Pierce as MacIntire
 Sam Robards as Chaplain Captain Kirk
 Steve Larson as Agent
 Vyto Ruginis as Prosecutor
 Maris Valainis as Streibig
 Darren E. Burrows as "Cherry"
 Sherman Howard as Court Martial President
 John Marshall Jones as Military Policeman
 Stephen Baldwin as Soldier (uncredited)
 Amy Irving as Voice of Girl On The Train (uncredited)

Production

Development
The film was based on the real-life incident on Hill 192, and on Daniel Lang's lengthy New Yorker article, "Casualties of War," published in October 1969 and released as a book, with the same title, a month later. Film rights were bought by David Susskind who was to produce the film for Warner Bros. Pete Hamill wrote a script and Jack Clayton was to direct. However the film was not made. In the meantime, Michael Verhoeven made his film based on the incident, titled o.k.. Verhoeven's film was entered to the Berlin Film Festival in 1970, causing so much controversy among the judges, that the festival was shut down for that year with no awards given. De Palma was at that festival with his film Dionysus in '69.

In the late 1970s Susskind announced he would make the film for ABC. This did not happen.

In 1979 David Rabe mentioned the project to Brian De Palma, who was interested but was unable to raise the money to finance it. Some years later Rabe had written a script, and De Palma attached Michael J. Fox and Sean Penn as actors. They almost succeeded in getting the film financed at Paramount Pictures, but ultimately decided not to proceed when the budget went from $17 million to $20 million. De Palma then went on to make The Untouchables which was a big hit; Dawn Steel had liked the project at Paramount, and when she became head of production at Columbia Pictures, Casualties of War was the first film she green-lit.

"Historically Vietnam War movies have been very profitable," said Steel. "All of them. Platoon, Full Metal Jacket, Apocalypse Now, The Deer Hunter. You're looking at movies that have never been not pretty successful, but very successful. The foreign numbers have been extraordinary."

Shooting
The film was shot in April–May 1988, mostly on location in Thailand, with some filming in San Francisco. The bridge location was filmed in Kanchanaburi, Thailand, which was the same as the famous Bridge on the River Kwai.

This film was Fox's third major dramatic role. He had previously starred in Light of Day and Bright Lights, Big City. John C. Reilly makes his screen debut in the film; he would work with Penn again in We're No Angels and State of Grace. John Leguizamo, who appeared in his first major film role, would again star with Penn in another picture by De Palma, 1993's Carlito's Way.

"Let's be honest," said Fox at the time. "If this movie makes a buck and a half it's going to be things like Bikini's Away for me. But to fail doing something unexpected is no disgrace. To fail doing the ordinary is a disaster. This movie is about how much you will risk if you have nothing to gain."

Release

Casualties of War opened in 1,487 theatres, and ranked number 4 in box office for the first week of its release. It went on to gross $18.7 million.

The theatrical cut of the film was released on DVD in 2001. This version has the original 113 minute running time.
An extended cut of the film was released on DVD in 2006, that contains two scenes cut from the original release. One has Eriksson being interrogated by the two investigators, and the other is the defense attorney (played by uncredited Gregg Henry) trying to discredit Eriksson during the trial. This extended version has a running time of 119 minutes.

Reception 
The film holds an 83% rating on Rotten Tomatoes based on 47 reviews. The site's consensus states: "Casualties of War takes a harrowing plunge into the Vietnam War with a well-acted ensemble piece that ranks among director Brian De Palma's more mature efforts." Audiences polled by CinemaScore gave the film an average grade of "B+" on an A+ to F scale.

Roger Ebert gave the film three stars out of four and wrote, "More than most films, it depends on the strength of its performances for its effect – and especially on Penn's performance. If he is not able to convince us of his power, his rage and his contempt for the life of the girl, the movie would not work. He does, in a performance of overwhelming, brutal power." Vincent Canby of The New York Times stated, "'Casualties of War' moves toward its climax so inevitably and surely that the courts-martial, which are the film's penultimate sequence, are no less riveting for the theatrical way in which they have been compressed." He also called Penn's performance "extremely fine" and wrote of Fox that he "remains firmly in character" in a "difficult" role. Todd McCarthy of Variety wrote, "A powerful metaphor of the national shame that was America's orgy of destruction in Vietnam, Brian DePalma's film is flawed by some punch-pulling but is sure to rouse strong audience interest, even if the Columbia release will be a bitter pill for many." Gene Siskel of the Chicago Tribune gave the film three stars out of four and called it "a major effort in a minor key because of the limitations of the simple story." Michael Wilmington of the Los Angeles Times wrote, "Casualties of War is DePalma's 19th movie and easily his best. His detractors saw his Hitchcock-pastiche thrillers as manipulative and sadistic, but here he's not dealing with stylish slashers or bloody set-pieces. He doesn't have to reach for a shock. He's dredging up a deeper horror: the hell that lies beneath every man's skin, waiting to erupt." Hal Hinson of The Washington Post praised it as "a film of great emotional power" and "one of the most punishing, morally complex movies about men at war ever made."

Dr. Valerie Wieskamp, who has written about sexual violence in U.S. wars, cites the film as an example of the whitewashing of U.S. military war crimes in popular culture. She highlights how the few changes made to the real story serve to support a narrative of the military as a flawed, but ultimately just and heroic institution. Among the details she highlights is its failure to mention that the sentences imposed at trial were later severely cut down, with the last of the perpetrators being freed after only four years. While Eriksson/Storeby is the hero whose bravery is suggested to represent U.S. national and military identity, even the rapists and murderers on his squad are granted an imaginary backstory of a recently fallen squadmate to "explain" their acts. 

 
De Palma invited Steven Spielberg to a private screening of the film, and after the screening ended, Spielberg said to Columbia Pictures executive Dawn Steel, "You'll be thinking about this for a week." David Rabe disassociated himself from the film, saying that De Palma had not been faithful to his script. It was also criticized by Vietnam veterans' groups. Quentin Tarantino has hailed the film as "the greatest film about the Vietnam War."

Awards
Wins
Political Film Society: PFS Award; Peace; 1990.

Nominations
Golden Globes: Golden Globe; Best Original Score - Motion Picture Ennio Morricone; 1990.
Motion Picture Sound Editors: Golden Reel Award; Best Sound Editing - Sound Effects; Maurice Schell; 1990.

See also
 o.k., a 1970 film also depicting the Incident on Hill 192
 The Visitors, a 1972 film also depicting the Incident on Hill 192
 Redacted, a 2007 film also directed by Brian DePalma depicting similar war crimes carried out by U.S. soldiers in Iraq

References

External links

 

1980s crime drama films
1980s legal films
1980s war drama films
1989 films
American legal drama films
American war drama films
American crime drama films
Anti-war films about the Vietnam War
Columbia Pictures films
Crime films based on actual events
Drama films based on actual events
Films scored by Ennio Morricone
Films about kidnapping
Films about murderers
Films about war crimes trials
Films directed by Brian De Palma
Films produced by Art Linson
Films set in San Francisco
Films set in the 1960s
Films shot in Thailand
Gang rape in fiction
Military courtroom films
Films about rape
War films based on actual events
Wartime sexual violence
Films about the United States Army
1989 crime drama films
1980s English-language films
1980s American films